Mast Ali-ye Olya (also Romanized as Mast ‘Alī-ye ‘Olyā; also known as Mast ‘Alī and Mast‘alī) is a village in Osmanvand Rural District, Firuzabad District, Kermanshah County, Kermanshah Province, Iran. At the 2006 census, its population was 320, in 66 families.

References 

Populated places in Kermanshah County